Chamil Perera (born 31 October 1979) is a Sri Lankan former cricketer. He played in 78 first-class and 46 List A matches between 2000/01 and 2009/10. He made his Twenty20 debut on 17 August 2004, for Galle Cricket Club in the 2004 SLC Twenty20 Tournament. Following his cricket career in Sri Lanka, he moved to the United States in 2014.

References

External links
 

1979 births
Living people
Sri Lankan cricketers
Burgher Recreation Club cricketers
Galle Cricket Club cricketers
Place of birth missing (living people)